Siah Dasht-e Olya (also Romanized as Sīāh Dasht-e ‘Olyā; also known as Sīāh Dasht-e Bālā) is a village in Farim Rural District, Dodangeh District, Sari County, Mazandaran Province, Iran. At the 2006 census, its population was 22, in 6 families.

References 

Populated places in Sari County